Rebecca Metz is an American actress. She is best known for her roles as Tressa on the FX television comedy-drama series Better Things, Melinda on the Showtime television comedy-drama series Shameless and Jenna Wrather on the Disney Channel comedy series Coop & Cami Ask the World.

Life and career
Metz was born and raised in Freehold Township, New Jersey and graduated from Carnegie Mellon University. In 1998, she had her first television appearance on the ABC series Politically Incorrect. Later, Metz won other roles on a variety of TV shows like Nip/Tuck, Boston Legal, The Mentalist, Californication, The Mindy Project, Shameless and more.

In 2010, she was the player support manager for Disney's Toontown Online. Later that year, she became the community manager for the game, until May 2011, when Disney laid off a majority of Toontown Online staff.

In 2016, she was cast in a recurring role as Tressa in the FX television comedy series Better Things. She is also a voice-over and stage actor whose theater credits include Sheila Callaghan's Kate Crackernuts and Burglars of Hamm's, The Behavior of Broadus.

In 2018, she was cast as Jenna Wrather on Disney Channels new live-action comedy Coop & Cami Ask the World which premiered on October 12, 2018.

Filmography

Television

Film

References

External links
 
 

Living people
American television actresses
20th-century American actresses
21st-century American actresses
People from Freehold Township, New Jersey
Actresses from New Jersey
Carnegie Mellon University alumni
Year of birth missing (living people)